Neville House (also known as the Tysen-Neville House) is a historic home located at New Brighton, Staten Island, New York.  It was built about 1770 and is constructed of red, quarried sandstone.  It is in two sections: a -story main section and -story east wing, each covered by a gable roof.  It features a 2-story verandah.

It was designated as a NYC Landmark in 1967.  It was also added to the National Register of Historic Places in 1977.

References

Houses on the National Register of Historic Places in Staten Island
Houses completed in 1770
1770 establishments in the Province of New York
New York City Designated Landmarks in Staten Island